"Dirty Van" is a song by Latvian rock band Crow Mother from their second album. It was released as the single from the album on 31 Aug 2016.

References

2016 songs
2016 singles